This is a list of neighbourhoods and outlying communities within the City of Ottawa, Ontario, Canada. In 2001, the old city of Ottawa was amalgamated with the suburbs of Nepean, Kanata, Gloucester, Rockcliffe Park, Vanier and Cumberland, and the rural townships of West Carleton, Osgoode, Rideau and Goulbourn, along with the systems and infrastructure of the Regional Municipality of Ottawa-Carleton, to become one municipality. The city is now organized into 23 wards.

Old City of Ottawa

Central Ottawa

ByWard Market
Centretown
Centretown West
Downtown
The Glebe
Golden Triangle
LeBreton Flats
Lower Town
Old Ottawa East
Old Ottawa South
Sandy Hill

East end

Carson Meadows
Castle Heights
Forbes
Lees Avenue
Lindenlea
Manor Park
New Edinburgh
Overbrook
Rockcliffe Park
Vanier
Viscount Alexander Park

South end

Airport-Uplands
Alta Vista
Billings Bridge
Confederation Heights
Ellwood
Elmvale Acres
Greenboro
Hawthorne Meadows
Heron Gate
Heron Park
Hunt Club
Hunt Club Park
Riverside Park
Riverview
Mooney's Bay Park
Sheffield Glen
South Keys
Urbandale

West end

Ambleside
Bel-Air Heights
Bel-Air Park
Belltown
Braemar Park
Britannia
Britannia Heights
Britannia Village
Carleton Heights
Carlington 
Carlingwood
Central Park
Champlain Park
Civic Hospital
Copeland Park
Courtland Park
Glabar Park
Hampton Park
Highland Park
Hintonburg
Kenson Park
Lincoln Heights
McKellar Heights
McKellar Park
Mechanicsville
Michele Heights
Qualicum
Queensway Terrace North
Redwood
Rideau View
Tunney's Pasture
Wellington Village
Westboro
Whitehaven
Woodpark
Woodroffe North

Gloucester

Beacon Hill
Blackburn Hamlet
Blossom Park
Carlsbad Springs
Carson Grove
Cedardale
Chapel Hill
Chateau Neuf
Convent Glen
Cyrville
Edwards
Elizabeth Park
Ficko
Findlay Creek
Gloucester Glen
Hiawatha Park
Honey Gables
Johnston Corners
Kempark
Leitrim
Limebank
Manotick Station
Orleans
Orléans Village
Orléans Wood
Pineview
Piperville
Ramsayville
Riverside South
Rothwell Heights
South Gloucester
Victory Hill
Windsor Park Village

Kanata

Beaverbrook
Bridlewood
Glen Cairn
Harwood Plains
Kanata
Kanata Lakes
Kanata West
Kanata Estates
Katimavik-Hazeldean
Lakeside
Malwood
Marchhurst
Marchwood
Morgan's Grant
South March
South March Station
Strathearn
Town Centre (Kanata)

Nepean

Arbeatha Park
Arlington Woods
Barrhaven
Bayshore
Bells Corners
Belltown
Borden Farm
Boyce
Briargreen
Carleton Heights
Cedarhill Estate
Centrepointe
City View
Clearview
Country Place
Craig Henry
Crestview
Crystal Bay
Crystal Beach
Davidson Heights
Fallowfield
Fisher Glen
Fisher Heights
Fraservale
Graham Park
Grenfell Glen
Hearts Desire
Hillsdale
Jockvale
Knollsbrook
Leslie Park
Longfields
Lynwood Village
Manordale
Meadowlands
The Meadows
Merivale Gardens
Navaho
Orchard Estates
Parkwood Hills
Pheasant Run
Pineglen
Qualicum
Rideau Glen
Rocky Point
Ryan Farm
Shirleys Bay
Skyline
Stonehedge
Tanglewood
Trend Village
Twin Elm
Valley Stream
Westcliffe Estates

Cumberland

Avalon
Bearbrook
Beckett Creek
Bella Vista
Burromee
Canaan
Chaperal
Chartrand
Chatelaine Village
Cumberland Village
Cumberland Estates
Fallingbrook
French Hill
Leonard
Martins Corners
Notre-Dame-des-Champs
Navan
River Walk
Sarsfield
Town Centre (Orleans)
Queenswood Heights
Queenswood South
Queenswood Village
Vars

Goulbourn

Amberwood Village
Ashton
Bryanston Gate
Dwyer Hill
Fringewood
Healey's Heath
Mansfield
Munster
Old Stittsville
Red Pine Estates
Richmond
Stanley Corners
Stapledon
Stittsville
Woodside Acres

Osgoode Township

Belmeade
Dalmeny
Greely
Herbert Corners
Kenmore
Marionville
Marvelville
Metcalfe
Osgoode
Pana
Reids Mills
Spring Hill
Vernon
West Osgoode

Rideau

Marlborough

Baxters Corners
Becketts Landing
Burritts Rapids
Goodstown
Malakoff
Mills Corners
Moores Corners
Pierces Corners

North Gower

Carsonby
Kars
Manotick
Reevecraig
North Gower
Watterson Corners

West Carleton

Fitzroy

Antrim
Fitzroy Harbour
Galetta
Kinburn
Marathon
Marathon Village
Marshall Bay
Mohr Corners
Panmure
Quyon Ferry Landing
Smith's Corners
Vydon Acres
Willola Beach
Woodridge

Huntley

Carp
Corkery
Huntley
Huntley Manor Estates
Manion Corners
Westmont Estates
Westwood

Torbolton

Baskin's Beach
Buckhams Bay
Constance Bay
Crown Point
Dirleton
Dunrobin
Dunrobin Heights
Dunrobin Shore
Kilmaurs
MacLarens
McKay's Waterfront
Torwood Estates
Woodlawn

Business improvement areas

Bank Street Promenade
Barrhaven
Bells Corners
ByWard Market
Carp
Downtown Rideau
The Glebe
Heart of Orleans
Manotick
Preston Street
Somerset Street Chinatown
Somerset Village
Sparks Street
Vanier
Wellington Street West
Westboro Village

Historical neighbourhoods

Ottawa - Central End
 Ashburnham - residential area downtown, bordered by Wellington St, Lyon St., Laurier Ave. and the Lebreton Aqueduct
 Mount Sherwood - 19th-century community located around where the Adult High School on Gladstone is today
 Nanny Goat Hill - 19th-century community today part of the LeBreton Flats, located at the foot of the eponymous Nanny Goat Hill
 Parkview - today part of The Glebe
 Rideauville - today part of Old Ottawa South
 Rochesterville - today makes up Centretown West
 Stewarton - today makes up The Glebe and Centretown

Ottawa - East End
 Clandeboye - today part of Vanier
 Clarkstown - today part of Vanier
 Cummings Bridge - today part of Vanier
 Eastview Centre - today part of Vanier
 Finter - today part of Viscount Alexander Park
 Village of Gloucester - today part of the Lindenlea neighbourhood south of New Edinburgh
 Janeville - see Vanier
 Rockcliffe Annex - today part of Viscount Alexander Park
 Rockville - also known as Rock Village, this neighbourhood developed around Gloucester Quarries opened by Antoine Robillard on Montreal Road

Ottawa - South End
 Bowesville - today part of the Macdonald-Cartier International Airport
 Brookfield - today part of Riverside Park
 Chaudiere Junction -  Railway junction near Bank and Walkley
 Gateville - located just south of Billings Bridge
 Gloucester Station - located near High Road and Earl Armstrong Road
 Hawthorne - Hawthorne & Russell Road, today close to Hawthorne Meadows
 Hurdman Bridge - area near Hurdman Station
 Willowdale - today part of the Eastway Gardens neighbourhood

Ottawa - West End
 Bayswater - today part of the Hintonburg neighbourhood
 Baytown - today part of the Westboro neighbourhood
 Birchton - today part of the Westboro neighbourhood
 Britanniaville - included what is today the neighbourhood of Britannia
 Evansville - today located in the neighbourhood of Carlington
 McLeansville - today part of Tunney's Pasture
 Merivale Village - today part of Carlington
 Nepeanville - located where the Central Experimental Farm is today

Ottawa - Others
 Bells Corners Station - close to Highway 416 and Baseline Road
 Blackburn - today part of Blackburn Hamlet
 Blackburn Station - area near Anderson Road and Renaud Road
 Cathartic - also known as Eastman's Springs; see Carlsbad Springs.
 Daniston - today part of Orleans
 Eagleson Corners - today part of Kanata
 Fallowfield Station - area near Cedarview Road and Strandherd Drive. Not to be confused with the current Fallowfield Station
 Federal Station - Prince of Wales Dr and Colonnade Road area
 Graham Bay Station - area near Richmond Road and Highway 417 
 Hazeldean - today part of Katimavik-Hazeldean, Kanata
 Long Island Village - located opposite the north end of Long Island near the community of Manotick
 Merivale Station - area near Fallowfield Station 
 St. Joseph - see Orleans
 Wellington - see Kars

Main communities 
This is a list of the main communities in the Ottawa area along with population numbers.

Greater areas and CMAs

Greater Ottawa-Gatineau Area population, year-end 2006: (pop. 1,316,830)
Ottawa-Gatineau CMA, mid-2006: (pop. 1,158,314)

Cities

Ottawa - (pop. 877,280)
Gatineau - (pop. 242,124)

Former cities
Ottawa (pop. 382,076) (Downtown Ottawa, The Glebe, Centretown, Lower Town, Sandy Hill, Billings Bridge)
Cumberland (pop. 52,430) (former township, became city in 1999)
Gloucester (pop. 110,264) (former township, became city in 1981)
Kanata (pop. 90,000) (merger of March, parts of Goulbourn and parts of Nepean)
Nepean (pop. 124,878) (former township, became city in 1978)
Vanier (pop. 17,632) (formerly known as Eastview)

Former villages
Rockcliffe Park (pop. 1,927)

Former townships
Goulbourn
Osgoode
Rideau (merger of Marlborough and North Gower)
West Carleton (merger of Torbolton, Fitzroy and Huntley)

Other main suburban areas

Orleans (pop. 100,000) (located in the former cities of Cumberland and Gloucester)
Barrhaven (pop. 70,000) (located in the former city of Nepean)
Stittsville (pop. 18,913) (located in the former township of Goulbourn)
Bells Corners (pop. 9,720)
Blackburn Hamlet (pop. 8,955)
Hunt Club (pop. 13,000)
Morgan's Grant (pop. 8,000)
Riverside South (pop. 8,000)
Riverview (pop. 11,704)

Rural villages and hamlets

Dalmeny, Ontario (pop. unknown)
Antrim (pop. unknown)
Corkery (pop. unknown)
Dwyer Hill (pop. unknown)
Burritts Rapids (pop. 100)
Ashton (pop. 108)
Galetta (pop. 177)
Dunrobin (pop. 288)
Kinburn (pop. 288)
Kenmore (pop. 321)
Fallowfield (pop. 366)
Edwards (pop. 402)
Sarsfield (pop. 474)
Vernon (pop. 597)
Kars (pop. 648)
Fitzroy Harbour (pop. 654)
Marionville (pop est. 900)
Vars (pop. 981)
Munster (pop. 1,320)
Carp (pop. 1,416)
Navan (pop. 1,593)
North Gower (pop. 1,749)
Cumberland (pop. 1,884)
Metcalfe (pop. 2,070)
Constance Bay (pop. 2,619)
Osgoode (pop. 2,784)
Richmond (pop. 3,301)
Greely (pop. 4,395)
Manotick (pop. 7,545)
Carlsbad Springs (pop. 916)
Piperville (pop. 593)

See also

List of roads in Ottawa

References

External links

 City of Ottawa: Neighbourhoods of Interest
 History of seven of Ottawa's urban communities: Virtual Museum of Canada Exhibit

 
Neighbourhoods
Lists of neighbourhoods in Canadian cities